Akie Noah is a Sierra Leonean international footballer of the 1970s and early 1980s.

Noah played for Ports Authority in the late 1970s and early 1980s, and now lives and works as a coach in California.

He is noted for scoring a goal against Algeria in a 1982 World Cup qualifier. In this game, Sierra Leone led 2-0 before Algeria fought back to draw 2-2. Algeria won the second leg 3-1.

External links

Akie Noah's Website

Year of birth missing (living people)
Living people
Sierra Leonean footballers
Sierra Leone international footballers
Association footballers not categorized by position